Blair Robson (born 15 May 1935) is a former New Zealand rally driver.

He finished second in the 1979 Rally of New Zealand, driving a Ford Escort RS 1800 MKII. He won the 1974 and 1978 New Zealand National Rally and was seeded seventh on the New Zealand Silver Fern Rally. His son, Patrick Robson, acted as his co-driver as of 2006. His contributions to rally driving were recognised at the Motorsport New Zealand 50th anniversary event.

References

1935 births
World Rally Championship drivers
New Zealand rally drivers
Living people